Ben Hornby (born 18 February 1980) is an Australian former professional rugby league footballer who played in the 2000s and 2010s. An Australia international and New South Wales State of Origin representative back, he captained the St George Illawarra Dragons of the National Rugby League from 2009 until his retirement in 2012. Hornby played his entire career with the Dragons, leading them to the 2010 NRL Premiership and becoming their most capped player since the formation of the joint venture club in 1999.

Early life
Hornby was born in Wollongong, New South Wales, Australia. He went to Corrimal Public School and Corrimal High School.

Playing career
Hornby began his NRL rugby league career in 2000. He represented New South Wales in the State of Origin series of 2004, 2006 and 2008 and played one match for Australia, their loss to Great Britain during the 2006 Rugby League Tri-Nations.

Previously a co-captain in 2007, in 2009 coach Wayne Bennett appointed Hornby captain of the St George Dragons from the start of the 2009 season. Hornby was selected for Country in the City vs Country match on 8 May 2009. However, he did not play in the match after withdrawing with injury.

On 3 October 2010, Hornby captained St. George Illawarra to their first Premiership in 31 years, when they defeated the Sydney Roosters 32–8 in the 2010 NRL Grand Final. He went on to captain the club to victory in the following February's 2011 World Club Challenge against the Wigan Warriors in England.

Hornby announced his retirement from St. George Illawarra in August 2012 after playing 13 seasons for the club.

Career highlights 

Junior Club: Corrimal Cougars
First Grade Debut: Round 23, St George Illawarra v Penrith at Penrith, 8 July 2000
Representative Record: Under 19 Australia 1999, Under 19s NSW 1999, Origin NSW 2004, City vs Country 2005 and 2006, NSW 2006, Junior Kangaroos 2006, Australia 2006
Captaincy: Round 1, St George Illawarra v Melbourne Storm at Melbourne, 2009
Premiership: Grand Final, St George Illawarra v Sydney Roosters at ANZ Stadium, 3 October 2010

Coaching career
Upon retiring in 2012, Hornby began his coaching career as the junior development coach for St. George before becoming an assistant to the first grade side in later years. In 2020, Hornby joined the South Sydney Rabbitohs club as the Development Coach. Since 2021, he has been the assistant coach to Wayne Bennett.

References

External links 
 State of Origin Official website Rugby League Player Stats
 Ben Hornby player profile at St. George Illawarra Dragons

1980 births
Living people
Australia national rugby league team players
Australian rugby league coaches
Australian rugby league players
Country New South Wales Origin rugby league team players
New South Wales Rugby League State of Origin players
Rugby league fullbacks
Rugby league halfbacks
Rugby league players from Wollongong
St. George Illawarra Dragons players